The Canadian province of New Brunswick's municipalities cover only 20% of its landmass, but 80% of its population. Many of those 101 municipalities have been created from amalgamations of several former municipalities, or by annexing unincorporated areas. Prior to several amalgamations that occurred in between 1991-1998, the province had over 123 municipalities.

List of neighbourhoods
This article lists neighbourhoods in municipalities in New Brunswick, the former municipalities that form the new municipality are listed and the year they joined the new municipality if known. Unincorporated areas that joined municipalities are mentioned as well, if known. Explanations on the basis of the amalgamations are given wherever possible.

City of Moncton

See also
List of people from New Brunswick
List of communities in New Brunswick

Municipal amalgamations
Geographic regions of New Brunswick

Mergers of administrative divisions in Canada